For Black Boys Who Have Considered Suicide When the Hue Gets Too Heavy is a 2021 play by Ryan Calais Cameron, inspired by Ntozake Shange's For Colored Girls Who Have Considered Suicide/When the Rainbow Is Enuf. The play follows six young Black British men - Jet, Midnight, Obsidian, Onyx, Pitch, and Sable  - meeting for group therapy.

The show was originally commissioned by New Diorama Theatre and co-commissioned by Boundless Theatre.

Production history 
The show opened on 12 October 2021 at New Diorama Theatre in London, running until November. Tristan Fynn-Aiduenu directed the original production. The production transferred to the Royal Court for a limited 5 week run from 31 March 2022 to 7 May 2022.
The show is scheduled for a limited engagement at the Apollo Theatre from 25 March 2023 until 7 May. All six original cast members will be returning, and Ryan Calais Cameron will be directing.

Cast

Awards

References 

2021 plays
British plays
Plays about race and ethnicity
Plays set in the 21st century
Plays set in England
West End plays